The Australian Human Rights Commission is the national human rights institution of Australia, established in 1986 as the Human Rights and Equal Opportunity Commission (HREOC) and renamed in 2008. It is a statutory body funded by, but operating independently of, the Australian Government. It is responsible for investigating alleged infringements of Australia's anti-discrimination legislation in relation to federal agencies.

The Australian Human Rights Commission Act 1986 articulates the Australian Human Rights Commission's role and responsibilities. Matters that can be investigated by the Commission under the Australian Human Rights Commission Regulations 2019 include discrimination on the grounds of age, medical record, an irrelevant criminal record; disability; marital or relationship status; nationality; sexual orientation; or trade union activity.

Commission officebearers
The Commission falls under the portfolio of the Attorney-General of Australia.

Commission presidents
The following individuals have been appointed as President of the Human Rights Commission, and its precedent organisation:

Aboriginal and Torres Strait Islander Social Justice Commissioners
The following individuals have been appointed as an Aboriginal and Torres Strait Islander Social Justice Commissioner:

Disability Discrimination Commissioners
The following individuals have been appointed as a Disability Discrimination Commissioners:

Human Rights Commissioners
The following individuals have been appointed as a Human Rights Commissioner:

Race Discrimination Commissioners
The following individuals have been appointed as a Race Discrimination Commissioner:

Sex Discrimination Commissioners
The following individuals have been appointed as a Sex Discrimination Commissioner:

Age Discrimination Commissioner
The following individuals have been appointed as an Age Discrimination Commissioner, or precedent titles:

National Children's Commissioner 
The following individuals have been appointed as a National Children's Commissioner:

Privacy Commissioner 
The following have served as Privacy Commissioner, initially at HREOC and then at two other Offices:

On 1 January 1989 the Privacy Act 1988 established the Privacy Commissioner within the commission. The Privacy Commissioner continued in the commission until 1 July 2000, when a new Office of the Privacy Commissioner was established by the federal Parliament, and the Privacy Commissioner was separated from the commission.

In 2010, the Office of the Australian Information Commissioner (OAIC) was established and the previously independent Office of the Privacy Commissioner was subsumed into it. The Privacy Commissioner now came under the supervision of the new Australian Information Commissioner, who could exercise the Privacy Commissioner's powers.

From 2014, the incoming Australian government under PM Tony Abbott attempted to abolish the OAIC, succeeding in having the Australian Information Commissioner (Prof John McMillan) unexpectedly retire early and FOI Commissioner (James Popple) resign, and cutting OAIC's budget. But the Senate failed to pass the necessary legislation (Freedom of Information Amendment (New Arrangements) Bill 2014). Several former judges suggested this pursuit of the abolition of a body created by Parliament without its support for that abolition raises constitutional and rule of law concerns. Then-Privacy Commissioner Pilgrim was appointed Acting Australian Information Commissioner in July 2015 for three months, filling all three OAIC roles on a part-time basis (and now also administering the Freedom of Information Act 1982 (Cth) and the Australian Information Commissioner Act 2010 (Cth)). He was reappointed as Acting Australian Information Commissioner in October 2015 for three months, and again on 19 January 2016 until 19 April 2016.

In early 2016, it remained unclear whether the Privacy Commissioner role would be returned to the Commission if the abolition of the OAIC were to succeed.

On 18 March 2016, the Commonwealth Attorney-General advertised for expressions of interest in the positions, to commence in July, of Age Discrimination Commissioner, Disability Discrimination Commissioner and Human Rights Commissioner; these positions were filled accordingly.

Legislation 
From its introduction until 2000, the Commission hosted the Commissioner administering the Privacy Act 1988 (Cth).

The Commission investigates alleged infringements under the following federal legislation:
Racial Discrimination Act 1975 (Cth)
Sex Discrimination Act 1984 (Cth)
Disability Discrimination Act 1992 (Cth)
Age Discrimination Act 2004 (Cth)
Australian Human Rights Commission Act 1986 (Cth) (formerly Human Rights and Equal Opportunity Commission Act 1986)

The Australian Human Rights Commission Act 1986 articulates the Australian Human Rights Commission's role and responsibilities. It gives effect to Australia's obligations under the following:

 International Covenant on Civil and Political Rights (ICCPR);
 Convention Concerning Discrimination in Respect of Employment and Occupation (ILO 111);
 Convention on the Rights of Persons with Disabilities;
 Convention on the Rights of the Child;
 Declaration of the Rights of the Child;
 Declaration on the Rights of Disabled Persons;
 Declaration on the Rights of Mentally Retarded Persons; and
 Declaration on the Elimination of All Forms of Intolerance and of Discrimination Based on Religion or Belief.

Matters that can be investigated by the Commission under the Australian Human Rights Commission Regulations 2019 include discrimination on the grounds of age, medical record, an irrelevant criminal record; disability; marital or relationship status; nationality; sexual orientation; or trade union activity.

Public inquiries 
One of the more visible functions of the commission is to conduct public inquiries. Some examples of inquiries conducted include:
Homeless Children Inquiry (1989) 
National Inquiry into Racist Violence in Australia (1989-1991)
Inquiry into the Accessibility of electronic commerce and new service and information technologies for older Australians and people with a disability (2000)
Pregnancy Discrimination Inquiry (2000)
Same-Sex: Same Entitlements Inquiry into financial and workplace discrimination against same-sex couples
Separation of Aboriginal and Torres Strait Islander Children from their Families (Bringing Them Home Report (1997))
National Inquiry into Children in Immigration Detention (2004) The report, A Last Resort? was published in April 2004.
National Inquiry into Children in Immigration Detention (2014) The Forgotten Children report was submitted by Gillian Triggs in November 2014.
Pregnancy and Return to Work National Review (2014)

Reviews
On 30 July 2020, the Australian Human Rights Commission announced that they would conduct a review of the country's gymnastics program, following complaints of physical and mental abuse from some of the former athletes. Former Australian gymnasts had reported being assaulted by coaches, fat-shamed and made to train and compete while injured.

Gender identity and sexuality

Private members' bills introduced from both the Australian Greens and the Australian Democrats tried to add sexuality and/or gender identity to the list of matters that can be investigated by the commission, which always failed to pass at least one house of parliament between 1995 and June 2007, because of a lack of support from both the Australian Labor Party and the Coalition in the federal parliament.

Relevant legislation was later passed in Acts such as the Sex Discrimination Amendment (Sexual Orientation, Gender Identity and Intersex Status) Act 2013.

Human Rights Awards and Medals 

Since 1987, the Human Rights Awards have been presented at the commission's annual Human Rights Medal and Awards ceremony.

International status
The Commission is one of some 70 national human rights institutions (NHRIs) accredited by the Global Alliance of National Human Rights Institutions (GANHRI), a body sponsored by the Office of the United Nations High Commissioner for Human Rights (OHCHR). The Commission's full ("A status") accreditation has allowed it special access to the United Nations human rights system, including speaking rights at the Human Rights Council and other committees. The Commission has been able to present parallel reports ("shadow reports") to UN treaty committees examining Australia's compliance with international human rights instruments. It has been very active in developing NHRIs throughout the Asia-Pacific region, and is a leading member of the Asia Pacific Forum of NHRIs, one of four regional sub-groups of NHRIs.

In April 2022, GANHRI informed the Commission that it has lost its "A status" and that its status would be reviewed after approximately 18 months.  GANHRI found that recent government decisions to appoint Commissioners had not been made with appropriate transparency.  It was also concerned about accumulated reductions in funding.

See also 
 Human Rights Commission

References

External links 
The Australian Human Rights Commission website
Office of the Australian Information Commissioner

National human rights institutions
Commonwealth Government agencies of Australia
Human Rights
Organisations serving Indigenous Australians
Human rights in Australia
1986 establishments in Australia